Marsha Miro wrote art news for the Detroit Free Press in the late 20th century (from 1974 to 1995), a position she held for 21-years. She is also author of works on Ceramicist Robert Turner, the Cranbrook Educational Community, Fiber Artist Gerhardt Knodel and painter Gordon Newton. A maker of documentary film on architecture, Miro has served the Cranbrook Educational Community as a historian of architecture. She writes for Glass Magazine, American Ceramics, American Craft and Casabella. Miro is the founding director of the  Museum of Contemporary Art Detroit (MOCAD).
Miro currently resides just outside Detroit, Michigan with her husband, Jeffrey. She is the mother of screenwriter Doug Miro, artist Darcy Miro and teacher Chelsea Miro.

References

American art historians
Living people
Year of birth missing (living people)
American women historians
Detroit Free Press people
American women journalists
Women art historians
21st-century American women